Ramim-e Shomali (also Romanized as Ramīm-e Shomālī; also known as Ramīm, and Rammam is a village in Saidiyeh Rural District, Bostan District, Dasht-e Azadegan County, Khuzestan Province, Iran. At the 2006 census, its population was 288, in 32 families.

References 

Populated places in Dasht-e Azadegan County